The 2018 College Nationals was the 23rd Men's and Women's College Nationals.  The College Nationals was a team handball tournament to determined the College National Champion from 2018 from the US.

Final ranking

Men's ranking

Women's ranking

References

External links
 Tournament Results

USA Team Handball College Nationals by year
Army Black Knights team handball